Programa Silvio Santos com Patrícia Abravanel is a Brazilian variety program presented and created by Silvio Santos and  broadcast by Sistema Brasileiro de Televisão (SBT). Airing since June 2, 1963, it is the second oldest television program in Brazil. It is the main attraction of SBT on Sundays. The program airs from 20:00 until midnight.  It is best known as a program of sequential segments, game shows, pranks and its famous airplanes of money.

In 1993, the program was even awarded the title of "Oldest Program of the Brazilian TV" by Guinness World Records, shortly after losing the title to the Mosaico na TV, broadcast since July 16, 1961.

In 2015, the program's 'Câmera Escondida' segment with a clown pieing shoppers at a shopping mall escalator went viral internationally, particularly through Twitter. This led many online to question its legitimacy as to whether the show used paid actors, or random members of the public. Contestant Lucas Nogueira confirmed that the various actors were paid to walk around the mall for a comedy show, and told that something would happen to them, but ef></ref>

References

External links

Variety shows
Sistema Brasileiro de Televisão original programming
Portuguese-language television shows